Prior to the Reformation of 1560, Christmas in Scotland, then called "Yule" (alternative spellings include Yhoill, Yuil, Ȝule and Ȝoull; see Yogh) or in Gaelic-speaking areas "Nollaig", was celebrated in a similar fashion to the rest of Catholic Europe. Calderwood recorded that in 1545, a few months before his murder, Cardinal Beaton had "passed over the Christmasse dayes with games and feasting". However, the Reformation transformed attitudes to traditional Christian feasting days, including Christmas, and led in practice to the abolition of festival days and other church holidays; the Kirk and the state being closely linked in Scotland during the Late Middle Ages and the Early Modern period. A 1640 Act of the Parliament of Scotland abolished the "Yule vacation and all observation thereof in time coming".

Post-Reformation suppression of Yule Tide celebrations
Two Acts of the Estates of Parliament — Act discharging the Yule vacance (2 June 1640) and Act dischargeing the Yule vacance (15 April 1690)— abolished the Yule Vacance (Christmas recess).

The first Act was partly repealed in 1686, when Episcopalianism was briefly in ascendancy within the Kirk.

The second Act was partly repealed in 1712 by the Yule Vacance Act 1711 of the Westminster Parliament.

Christmas became a Bank Holiday in Scotland, in 1871.

The 1640 Act stated (in Middle Scots):

 "... the kirke within this kingdome is now purged of all superstitious observatione of dayes... thairfor the saidis estatis have dischairged and simply dischairges the foirsaid Yule vacance and all observation thairof in tymecomeing, and rescindis and annullis all acts, statutis and warrandis and ordinances whatsoevir granted at any tyme heirtofoir for keiping of the said Yule vacance, with all custome of observatione thairof, and findis and declaires the samene to be extinct, voyd and of no force nor effect in tymecomeing." (English translation: "... the kirk within this kingdom is now purged of all superstitious observation of days... therefore the said estates have discharged and simply discharge the foresaid Yule vacation and all observation thereof in time coming, and rescind and annul all acts, statutes and warrants and ordinances whatsoever granted at any time heretofore for keeping of the said Yule vacation, with all custom of observation thereof, and find and declare the same to be extinct, void and of no force nor effect in time coming.")

Robert Jamieson recorded the opinion of an English clergyman regarding the post-reformation suppression of Christmas:
"The ministers of Scotland, in contempt of the holy-day observed by England, cause their wives and servants to spin in open sight of the people upon Yule day, and their affectionate auditors constrain their servants to yoke their plough on Yule day, in contempt of Christ's nativity. Which our Lord has not left unpunished, for their oxen ran wud, and brak their necks and lamed some ploughmen, which is notoriously known in some parts of Scotland."

Daft Days
The period of festivities running from Christmas to Handsel Monday, including Hogmanay and Ne'erday, is known as the Daft Days.

Post-war period

Christmas in Scotland was traditionally observed very quietly because the Church of Scotland, a Presbyterian church, for various reasons suppressed Christmas celebrations in Scotland after the Reformation.

Christmas Day was made a public holiday in 1958 in Scotland, Boxing Day only in 1974. The New Year's Eve festivity, Hogmanay, was by far the largest celebration in Scotland. The giftgiving, public holidays and feasting associated with mid-winter were traditionally held between 11 December and 6 January. However, since the 1980s, the fading of the Church's influence and the increased influences from the rest of the United Kingdom and elsewhere, Christmas and its related festivities are now nearly on par with, or surpass, Hogmanay and Ne'erday. Edinburgh, Glasgow and other cities now have traditional German Christmas market from late November until Christmas Eve.

See also
Auld Lang Syne
Five Articles of Perth
Little Christmas
Taladh Chriosda
Up Helly Aa

References

 
Religion and politics
Scottish Reformation
Acts of the Parliament of Scotland
1690 in Scotland
1690 in politics
17th-century Calvinism
1690 in Christianity
1640 in Christianity
Church of Scotland